On 18 March 2018, a fire broke out at the Manila Pavilion Hotel in Manila, Philippines. The hotel, located in the Ermita district of Manila, was filled with foreign tourists at the time of the fire who were mostly able to evacuate through the hotel's fire exits. The fire, burning on the lower floors of the hotel, sent smoke upward and trapped some employees and guests as it spread throughout the complex.

Fire
The fire began in the morning hours when many of the guests were awake, enabling evacuation efforts. Fire rescue operations worked to save several dozen guests from the rooftop of the hotel as smoke chased guests upward. Over 300 guests were evacuated from the hotel safely, and firefighters were dually challenged by heavy winds and huge quantities of smoke as they attempted to extinguish the blaze. 19 people were believed trapped on the fifth floor by fire officials, who worked for hours determining a safe way to free them. Employees could be seen fleeing from the building covering their mouths with handkerchiefs to block out the thick smoke as fire burned around the second and lower floors.  The fire caused 6 fatalities and sent 23 people to the hospital as it raged for over 9 hours.

The fire was burning intensely throughout the 2nd and lower floors, creating a challenge for Philippine fire experts to initially identify the origin of the inferno. Firefighters reported that several floors of the hotel were "totally damaged" but the investigation was still incomplete at that time. It was reported that the fire rekindled past 11 am, on 20 March but was soon re-extinguished.

Aftermath 
Officials initially stated that 4 people were killed by smoke inhalation.  The death toll decreased to three as Manila Doctors Hospital reported one of those believed dead from smoke inhalation was revived in critical condition, but increased to 6 as more victims were found or died. At least 3 fatalities occurred when casino employees, including security, were trapped by smoke in the casino's treasury room, with the final count in the building ending at 5.

The hotel's casino operator, the Philippine Amusement and Gaming Corp., stated that 3 of their employees had died and two closed-circuit television operators were missing. Director of Manila Disaster Risk and Reduction Management Johnny Yu later gave a figure of 5 fatalities to the press. The director announced the fire's sixth fatality on March 21, an employee of the hotel's casino who had been in critical condition since the fire.

The Philippine National Red Cross (PRC) responded to the fire, and reported that it was raised to a fifth alarm fire at 10:10 am.

References 

2018 disasters in the Philippines
2018 fires in Asia
21st century in Manila
Fires in the Philippines
Hotel fires
March 2018 events in the Philippines
History of Manila